Dean Thompson is a fictional character on the Australian television soap opera Home and Away.

Dean Thompson may also refer to:

Dean R. Thompson (born 1967), American diplomat
Dean Thompson (racing driver) (born 2001), American stock car racer